Yaupi is a primarily Shuar village with a few hundred residents in the province of Morona Santiago, Logroño Canton, Yaupi Parish, Ecuador. 

Populated places in Morona-Santiago Province